Luis Fernando Olivera Vega (born in Lima on July 26, 1958) is a Peruvian politician and leader of Independent Moralizing Front (FIM), a Peruvian political party.

Biography 
Fernando Olivera (also known as Popy, after a popular 80's clown) gained some support after the fall of the Fujimori government as an anti-corruption figure, having made secret tapes public showing Fujimori's advisor Vladimiro Montesinos bribing money to Congressmen Alberto Kouri, politicians and members of the media to join Fujimori's Peru 2000 party.

He and his party also have a history of confrontation with Alan García and APRA. FIM has also been ruling party Peru Possible's main ally during Alejandro Toledo's government.  In September 2002, he was appointed Ambassador of Peru to Spain, a position he held until August 11, 2005. Recently, his party has been weakened due to a scandal that cost him his office as ambassador to Spain. The dismissal was allegedly due to inefficiency during his office. His designation as Minister of Foreign Affairs was very controversial, due to his lack of experience as a diplomat and his reputation for being conflictive, forcing him to resign.

He was registered as FIM's presidential candidate for the 2006 national election until 8 February 2006, when he dropped out of the race to lead the party's Congressional candidate list. His presidential campaign had been very unsuccessful, getting at most a couple percent of support nationwide, according to all public opinion polls since the official start of the electoral race in January.

In 2015, he presented his candidacy for the 2016 general elections of Peru, for the Hope Front party, with Carlos Cuaresma and Juana Avellaneda as his candidates for First and Second Vice Presidents. Once the elections were held, they reached 203, 103 votes. Given that the electoral threshold is 5%, the party failed to cross the 5% threshold and lost its registration in the National Elections Jury.

References

1958 births
Living people
Foreign ministers of Peru
Candidates for President of Peru
Independent Moralizing Front politicians
Members of the Congress of the Republic of Peru
Members of the Democratic Constituent Congress
University of the Pacific (Peru) alumni